Gyeongjong of Goryeo (9 November 955 – 13 August 981) (r. 975–981) was the fifth ruler of the Goryeo dynasty of Korea. He was the eldest son of Gwangjong and was confirmed as Crown Prince in the year of his birth.

Upon rising to the throne, Gyeongjong established the Jeonsigwa (land-allotment system). Later, according to the Goryeo-sa, he avoided politics and royalty, and spent his time cavorting with commoners.

Family

Father: Gwangjong of Goryeo (고려 광종)
Grandfather: Taejo of Goryeo (고려 태조)
Grandmother: Queen Sinmyeong (신명왕후)
Mother: Queen Daemok (대목왕후)
Grandfather: Taejo of Goryeo (고려 태조)
Grandmother: Queen Sinjeong (신정왕후)
Consorts and their Respective Issue(s):
Queen Heonsuk of the Gyeongju Gim clan (헌숙왕후 김씨) – No issue.
Queen Heonui of the Chungju Yu clan (헌의왕후 유씨); first cousin – No issue.
Queen Heonae of the Hwangju Hwangbo clan (헌애왕후 황보씨); half first cousin.
Wang Song, Prince Gaeryeong (왕송 개령군)
Queen Heonjeong of the Hwangju Hwangbo clan (헌정왕후 황보씨); half first cousin – No issue.
Lady Daemyeong of the Jeongju Yu clan (대명궁부인 유씨); half first cousin – No issue.

In popular culture
 Portrayed by Kim Min-woo in the 2002–2003 KBS TV series The Dawn of the Empire.
Portrayed by Choi Cheol-ho in the 2009 KBS2 TV series Empress Cheonchu.

See also
List of Goryeo people
List of Korean rulers

References

 

955 births
981 deaths
10th-century Korean monarchs
People from Kaesong